"Earth" is a charity single by American rapper Lil Dicky. It was released on April 19, 2019, as three days before Earth Day, through Dirty Burd, Commission and BMG. The song features vocals from Dicky, Justin Bieber, Ariana Grande, Halsey, Zac Brown, Brendon Urie, Hailee Steinfeld, Wiz Khalifa, Snoop Dogg, Kevin Hart, Adam Levine, Shawn Mendes, Charlie Puth, Sia, Miley Cyrus, Lil Jon, Rita Ora, Miguel, Katy Perry, Lil Yachty, Ed Sheeran, Meghan Trainor, Joel Embiid, Tory Lanez, John Legend, Psy, Bad Bunny, Kris Wu, Backstreet Boys, and Leonardo DiCaprio.

Background
On April 19, 2019, Dicky took to Twitter to announce the release of a new song the following week. It was also reported that Canadian singer Justin Bieber would return to music as a guest feature on a new Lil Dicky song. Bieber confirmed the collaboration on Twitter a few days later. Over 30 celebrities and singer-songwriters are in the recording studio to perform the song.

Music video
On April 17, Dicky released a preview of the video that was released the following day. Co-directed by Nigel Tierney of Emmy-winning studio RYOT (the studio that made Behind the Fence VR), Federico Heller of 3Dar (the studio that made Uncanny Valley), Oddbot Animation, and Iconic Engine, the music video is told from the perspective of various animals affected by climate change, with their voices being provided by 30 celebrities and singer-songwriters.

Reception
The song received mostly negative reviews from critics. In a Pitchfork review, Jeremy D. Larson panned "Earth" as a "terrible song" that "sounds less like a charity single and more like a theme to a downmarket Disney clone made explicitly to launder money for an offshore criminal enterprise". Spin magazine included the song in their list of the worst songs of 2019, calling it a qualitative step back to Dicky's 2018 single "Freaky Friday". Tech2 News Staff gave an overall mixed review on the song. Journalist Evan Haynos claimed the song "lands flat" and "The humor in the song ... misses the target." Music journalist Gregg Johnson gave the song a generally positive review. Writer Keith Mann heavily criticized the song, saying it is "astonishingly bad" and "generic, soulless, laughless, [and] overblown".

Vocalists
List of guest vocalists with the role each plays in the song:

 Lil Dicky as Human
 Justin Bieber as Baboon
 Ariana Grande as Zebra
 Halsey as Lion cub
 Zac Brown as Cow
 Brendon Urie as Pig
 Hailee Steinfeld as Common fungus
 Wiz Khalifa as Skunk
 Snoop Dogg as Marijuana plant
 Kevin Hart as Kanye West
 Adam Levine as Vultures
 Shawn Mendes as Rhino
 Charlie Puth as Giraffe
 Sia as Kangaroo
 Miley Cyrus as Elephant
 Lil Jon as Clam
 Rita Ora as Wolf
 Miguel as Squirrel
 Katy Perry as Pony
 Lil Yachty as HPV
 Ed Sheeran as Koala
 Meghan Trainor as India
 Joel Embiid as Africa
 Tory Lanez as China
 John Legend, Psy, Bad Bunny, and Kris Wu as backup vocals at the end (with three languages)
 Backstreet Boys as Credits (video version only)
 Leonardo DiCaprio as Himself (video version only)

Charts

Certifications

See also
 Charity supergroup
 Earth anthem

References

2019 songs
Charity singles
Environmental songs
Leonardo DiCaprio
Lil Dicky songs
Song recordings produced by Benny Blanco
Song recordings produced by Cashmere Cat
Animated music videos
Songs written by Cashmere Cat
Songs written by Ammo (record producer)
Songs written by Benny Blanco
All-star recordings
BMG Rights Management singles